Barrier islands are coastal landforms and a type of dune system that are exceptionally flat or lumpy areas of sand that form by wave and tidal action parallel to the mainland coast. They usually occur in chains, consisting of anything from a few islands to more than a dozen. They are subject to change during storms and other action, but absorb energy and protect the coastlines and create areas of protected waters where wetlands may flourish. A barrier chain may extend uninterrupted for over a hundred kilometers, excepting the tidal inlets that separate the islands, the longest and widest being Padre Island of Texas, United States. Sometimes an important inlet may close permanently, transforming an island into a peninsula, thus creating a barrier peninsula, often including a beach, barrier beach.
The length and width of barriers and overall morphology of barrier coasts are related to parameters including tidal range, wave energy, sediment supply, sea-level trends, and basement controls. The amount of vegetation on the barrier has a large impact on the height and evolution of the island.

Chains of barrier islands can be found along approximately 13-15% of the world's coastlines. They display different settings, suggesting that they can form and be maintained in a variety of environments. Numerous theories have been given to explain their formation.

A human-made offshore structure constructed parallel to the shore is called a breakwater. In terms of coastal morphodynamics, it acts similarly to a naturally occurring barrier island by dissipating and reducing the energy of the waves and currents striking the coast. Hence, it is an important aspect of coastal engineering.

Constituent parts
Upper shoreface
The shoreface is the part of the barrier where the ocean meets the shore of the island. The barrier island body itself separates the shoreface from the backshore and lagoon/tidal flat area. Characteristics common to the upper shoreface are fine sands with mud and possibly silt. Further out into the ocean the sediment becomes finer. The effect of waves at this point is weak because of the depth. Bioturbation is common and many fossils can be found in upper shoreface deposits in the geologic record.

Middle shoreface
The middle shoreface is located in the upper shoreface. The middle shoreface is strongly influenced by wave action because of its depth. Closer to shore the sand is medium-grained, with shell pieces common. Since wave action is heavier, bioturbation is not likely.

Lower shoreface
The lower shoreface is constantly affected by wave action. This results in development of herringbone sedimentary structures because of the constant differing flow of waves. The sand is coarser.

Foreshore
The foreshore is the area on land between high and low tide. Like the upper shoreface, it is constantly affected by wave action. Cross-bedding and lamination are present and coarser sands are present because of the high energy present by the crashing of the waves. The sand is also very well sorted.

Backshore
The backshore is always above the highest water level point. The berm is also found here which marks the boundary between the foreshore and backshore. Wind is the important factor here, not water. During strong storms high waves and wind can deliver and erode sediment from the backshore.

Dunes
Coastal dunes, created by wind, are typical of a barrier island. They are located at the top of the backshore. The dunes will display characteristics of typical aeolian wind-blown dunes. The difference is that dunes on a barrier island typically contain coastal vegetation roots and marine bioturbation.

Lagoon and tidal flats
The lagoon and tidal flat area is located behind the dune and backshore area. Here the water is still, which allows fine silts, sands, and mud to settle out. Lagoons can become host to an anaerobic environment. This will allow high amounts of organic-rich mud to form. Vegetation is also common.

Location 

Barrier Islands can be observed on every continent on Earth, except Antarctica.

Australia 

Moreton Bay, on the east coast of Australia and directly east of Brisbane, is sheltered from the Pacific Ocean by a chain of very large barrier islands. Running north to south they are Bribie Island, Moreton Island, North Stradbroke Island and South Stradbroke Island (the last two used to be a single island until a storm created a channel between them in 1896). North Stradbroke Island is the second largest sand island in the world and Moreton Island is the third largest.

Fraser Island, another barrier island lying 200 km north of Moreton Bay on the same coastline, is the largest sand island in the world.

United States 

Barrier islands are found most prominently on the United States' East and Gulf Coasts, where every state—from Maine to Florida (East Coast) and from Florida to Texas (Gulf Coast)—features at least part of a barrier island. Many have large numbers of barrier islands; Florida for instance has twenty-five.  Padre Island, Texas, is the world’s longest barrier island; other well-known islands on the Gulf Coast include Galveston Island in Texas and Sanibel and Captiva Islands in Florida. Those on the East Coast include Miami Beach and Palm Beach in Florida; Hatteras Island in North Carolina; Assateague Island in Virginia and Maryland; Absecon Island in New Jersey, where Atlantic City is located; and Jones Beach Island and Fire Island, both off Long Island in New York. No barrier islands are found on the Pacific Coast of the United States due to the rocky shore and short continental shelf, but barrier peninsulas can be found. Barrier islands can also be seen on Alaska's Arctic coast.

Canada 

Barrier Islands can also be found in Maritime Canada, and other places along the coast. A good example is found at Miramichi Bay, New Brunswick, where Portage Island as well as Fox Island and Hay Island protect the inner bay from storms in the Gulf of Saint Lawrence.

Mexico 

Mexico's Gulf Coast has numerous barrier islands and barrier Peninsulas.

New Zealand
Barrier islands are more prevalent in the north of both of New Zealand's main islands. Notable barrier islands in New Zealand include Matakana Island, which guards the entrance to Tauranga Harbour, and Rabbit Island, at the southern end of Tasman Bay / Te Tai-o-Aorere. See also Nelson Harbour's Boulder Bank, below.

Europe 

Barrier islands can be observed in the Baltic Sea from Poland to Lithuania as well as distinctly in the Wadden Islands, which stretch from the Netherlands to Denmark. Lido di Venezia and Pellestrina are notable barrier islands of the Lagoon of Venice which have for centuries protected the city of Venice in Italy. Chesil Beach on the south coast of England developed as a barrier beach.

Processes

Migration and overwash
Water levels may be higher than the island during storm events. This situation can lead to overwash, which brings sand from the front of the island to the top and/or landward side of the island. This process leads to the evolution and migration of the barrier island.
Critical width concept
Barrier islands are often formed to have a certain width. The term “critical width concept” has been discussed with reference to barrier islands, overwash, and washover deposits since the 1970s. The concept basically states that overwash processes were effective in migration of the barrier only where the barrier width is less than a critical value. The island did not narrow below these values because overwash was effective at transporting sediment over the barrier island, thereby keeping pace with the rate of ocean shoreline recession. Sections of the island with greater widths experienced washover deposits that did not reach the bayshore, and the island narrowed by ocean shoreline recession until it reached the critical width. The only process that widened the barrier beyond the critical width was breaching, formation of a partially subaerial flood shoal, and subsequent inlet closure.
For the present discussion, critical barrier width is defined as the smallest cross-shore dimension that minimizes net loss of sediment from the barrier island over the defined project lifetime. The magnitude of critical width is related to sources and sinks of sand in the system, such as the volume stored in the dunes and the net long-shore and cross-shore sand transport, as well as the island elevation. The concept of critical width is important for large-scale barrier island restoration, in which islands are reconstructed to optimum height, width, and length for providing protection for estuaries, bays, marshes and mainland beaches.

Formation theories

Scientists have proposed numerous explanations for the formation of barrier islands for more than 150 years. There are three major theories: offshore bar, spit accretion, and submergence. No single theory can explain the development of all barriers, which are distributed extensively along the world's coastlines. Scientists accept the idea that barrier islands, including other barrier types, can form by a number of different mechanisms.

There appears to be some general requirements for formation. Barrier island systems develop most easily on wave-dominated coasts with a small to moderate tidal range. Coasts are classified into three groups based on tidal range: microtidal, 0–2 meter tidal range; mesotidal, 2–4 meter tidal range; and macrotidal, >4 meter tidal range. Barrier islands tend to form primarily along microtidal coasts, where they tend to be well developed and nearly continuous. They are less frequently formed in mesotidal coasts, where they are typically short with tidal inlets common. Barrier islands are very rare along macrotidal coasts. Along with a small tidal range and a wave-dominated coast, there must be a relatively low gradient shelf. Otherwise, sand accumulation into a sandbar would not occur and instead would be dispersed throughout the shore. An ample sediment supply is also a requirement for barrier island formation. The last major requirement for barrier island formation is a stable sea level. It is especially important for sea level to remain relatively unchanged during barrier island formation and growth. If sea level changes are too drastic, time will be insufficient for wave action to accumulate sand into a dune, which will eventually become a barrier island through aggradation. The formation of barrier islands requires a constant sea level so that waves can concentrate the sand into one location.

Offshore bar theory
In 1845 the Frenchman Elie de Beaumont published an account of barrier formation. He believed that waves moving into shallow water churned up sand, which was deposited in the form of a submarine bar when the waves broke and lost much of their energy. As the bars developed vertically, they gradually rose above sea level, forming barrier islands.

Spit accretion theory
American geologist Grove Karl Gilbert first argued in 1885 that the barrier sediments came from longshore sources. He proposed that sediment moving in the breaker zone through agitation by waves in longshore drift would construct spits extending from headlands parallel to the coast. The subsequent breaching of spits by storm waves would form barrier islands.

Submergence theory

William John McGee reasoned in 1890 that the East and Gulf coasts of the United States were undergoing submergence, as evidenced by the many drowned river valleys that occur along these coasts, including Raritan, Delaware and Chesapeake bays. He believed that during submergence, coastal ridges were separated from the mainland, and lagoons formed behind the ridges. He used the Mississippi–Alabama barrier islands (consists of Cat, Ship, Horn, Petit Bois and Dauphin Islands) as an example where coastal submergence formed barrier islands. His interpretation was later shown to be incorrect when the ages of the coastal stratigraphy and sediment were more accurately determined.

Along the coast of Louisiana, former lobes of the Mississippi River delta have been reworked by wave action, forming beach ridge complexes. Prolonged sinking of the marshes behind the barriers has converted these former vegetated wetlands to open-water areas. In a period of 125 years, from 1853 to 1978, two small semi-protected bays behind the barrier developed as the large water body of Lake Pelto, leading to Isles Dernieres's detachment from the mainland.

Boulder Bank
An unusual natural structure in New Zealand may give clues to the formation processes of barrier islands. The Boulder Bank, at the entrance to Nelson Haven at the northern end of the South Island, is a unique 13 km-long stretch of rocky substrate a few metres in width. It is not strictly a barrier island, as it is linked to the mainland at one end. The Boulder Bank is composed of granodiorite from Mackay Bluff, which lies close to the point where the bank joins the mainland. It is still debated what process or processes have resulted in this odd structure, though longshore drift is the most accepted hypothesis. Studies have been conducted since 1892 to determine the speed of boulder movement. Rates of the top-course gravel movement have been estimated at 7.5 metres a year.

Ecological importance 
Barrier islands are critically important in mitigating ocean swells and other storm events for the water systems on the mainland side of the barrier island, as well as protecting the coastline. This effectively creates a unique environment of relatively low energy, brackish water. Multiple wetland systems such as lagoons, estuaries, and/or marshes can result from such conditions depending on the surroundings. They are typically rich habitats for a variety of flora and fauna. Without barrier islands, these wetlands could not exist; they would be destroyed by daily ocean waves and tides as well as ocean storm events. One of the most prominent examples is the Louisiana barrier islands.

See also
 North Frisian Barrier Island
 Outer Banks
 Virginia Barrier Islands
 New York Barrier Islands
 Texas barrier islands
 Sea Islands
 Long Beach Island
 Bald Head Island

Notes

References

External links

Physical oceanography
Coastal geography
Hydrology
 
Coastal and oceanic landforms
Oceanographical terminology
Islands by type